Demophilus may refer to:

 Demophilus of Thespiae led a contingent of about 700 Thespians at the Battle of Thermopylae (480 BC), and was killed there
 Demophilus, an ancient Greek artist from Sicily
 Demophilus (historian) edited the first universal history which was written by his father Ephorus
 Demophilus of Constantinople, bishop of Constantinople from 370 until expelled in 380